Antrodiaetus pacificus is a species of mygalomorph spiders native to the Pacific Northwest. Both male and female were first described by French arachnologist Eugène Louis Simon in 1884 under the name Brachybothrium pacificum. The genus name is a combination of the Greek "antrodiaitos" (αντροδιαιτος), meaning "living in caves", "antron" (αντρον), meaning "cave", and "diaita (διαιτα), meaning "way of life, dwelling". The specific epithet refers to its geographical distribution along the pacific coast of North America, between San Francisco Bay and Alaska. It is the northernmost mygalomorph spider in North America.

Both males and females have a carapace that is dark brown to black, and two to three sclerotized patches on the abdomen. They are active year-round, but most activity occurs between late July and early September, peaking around mating season between early June and late November. They live in cool, damp forest and build burrows in soft substrates, usually sand, moss, or decaying wood, where they brood their eggs and overwinter. During the day, they keep the entrance closed, but when the sun sets and it is sufficiently dark, they will open the burrow and wait at the entrance for potential prey to wander by, predominantly beetles.

References

External links

Antrodiaetidae
Spiders of North America
Spiders described in 1884
Taxa named by Eugène Simon